David Cecil Fowler Burton, better known as Cecil Burton, (13 September 1887 – 24 September 1971) was a first-class cricketer, who played for Cambridge University (1907-1908), Marylebone Cricket Club (MCC) (1910-1922) and Yorkshire (1907-1921). He captained Yorkshire from 1919 to 1921.

He was born in Bridlington, East Riding of Yorkshire, England. A right-handed batsman, Burton scored 3,057 runs in his 130 first-class matches, with a highest score of 142* against Hampshire. His other century, 110, came against Leicestershire. He averaged 20.24 with the bat, and took 54 catches in the field. His brother Claude Burton, cousin David S.G. Burton and uncle Arthur Trollope, all played first-class cricket.

Burton died at the age of 84 in September 1971, in Chertsey, Surrey.

References

Sources
Cricinfo Profile
Cricket Archive Statistics

1887 births
1971 deaths
Yorkshire cricketers
Yorkshire cricket captains
People from Bridlington
Cambridge University cricketers
Marylebone Cricket Club cricketers
English cricketers
Gentlemen cricketers
Sportspeople from Yorkshire
English cricketers of 1919 to 1945